La Caze, LaCaze, or Lacaze may refer to:

People
 Genevieve LaCaze (b. 1989), Australian athlete
 Joey LaCaze (1971–2013), American drummer
 Louis La Caze (1798–1869), French physician and collector of paintings
 Marguerite La Caze (born 1964), Australian philosopher
 Robert La Caze (1917–2015), French-born Moroccan racing driver

Places
 Lacaze, a commune in France

See also 
 Caze (disambiguation)